Arnaudiella is a genus of fungi in the Microthyriaceae family.

References

External links
Index Fungorum

Microthyriales